Hernán Oelckers (25 December 1925 – 2009) was a Chilean alpine skier. He competed in three events at the 1948 Winter Olympics.

References

1925 births
2009 deaths
Chilean male alpine skiers
Olympic alpine skiers of Chile
Alpine skiers at the 1948 Winter Olympics
Sportspeople from Santiago
20th-century Chilean people